Igiliz is a medieval village located on the edge of the Sous valley in the Anti-Atlas mountains of Morocco. It is most known for being the birthplace of Ibn Tumart, founder of the Almohad caliphate. The village was known as place of pilgrimage by Ibn Tumart's followers during Almohad rule.

Name 
Igiliz is a toponym in Berber that can be translated to "mountain peak" or "isolated mountain".

Architecture 
Igiliz is fortified by two defense walls. There is a residential complex, the Qasba, centered around two courtyards. There is the presence of  two places of worship, including a large mosque. Artificial caves, former quarries, were used as places of spiritual retreat and pilgrimage.

History 
The village was built in the 11th century by the Arghen, Ibn Tumart's tribe, as a ribât. Ceramics jars, lamps, plates, braziers, pans, marmites, couscoussiers, flowerpots and a bread oven were found in the archeological site. It is theorized that the community in Igiliz held a market every Friday, to correspond with the Friday sermon, to exchange goods and news, settle disputes, negotiate marriage, and maintain contact with the larger Masmuda tribal confederation.

References 

History of Morocco